Roberto Gil is the name of:

Roberto Gil (footballer), Spanish footballer
Roberto Gil (politician), Mexican politician